Blair is a town in Jackson County, Oklahoma, United States. The population was 818 at the 2010 census.

Geography
Blair is located at  (34.779056, -99.333328).

Demographics

As of the census of 2000, there were 894 people, 361 households, and 258 families residing in the town. The population density was 2,131.3 people per square mile (821.8 per km 2). There were 430 housing units at an average density of 1,025.1 per square mile (395.3 per km 2). The racial makeup of the town was 86.69% White, 1.79% Native American, 0.34% Asian, 0.11% Pacific Islander, 7.49% from other races, and 3.58% from two or more races. Hispanic or Latino of any race were 10.40% of the population.

There were 361 households, out of which 36.3% had children under the age of 18 living with them, 56.8% were married couples living together, 11.1% had a female householder with no husband present, and 28.3% were non-families. 25.2% of all households were made up of individuals, and 12.7% had someone living alone who was 65 years of age or older. The average household size was 2.48 and the average family size was 2.96.

In the town, the population was spread out, with 28.6% under the age of 18, 9.2% from 18 to 24, 24.5% from 25 to 44, 23.6% from 45 to 64, and 14.1% who were 65 years of age or older. The median age was 36 years. For every 100 females, there were 95.2 males. For every 100 females age 18 and over, there were 88.8 males.

The median income for a household in the town was $29,821, and the median income for a family was $33,125. Males had a median income of $25,739 versus $19,038 for females. The per capita income for the town was $12,833. About 11.7% of families and 14.6% of the population were below the poverty line, including 16.3% of those under age 18 and 16.4% of those age 65 or over.

Climate

Notable people
Clarence Ray Allen, executed murderer
Bob Stephenson, baseball player

References

External links
 Encyclopedia of Oklahoma History and Culture - Blair

Towns in Jackson County, Oklahoma
Towns in Oklahoma